The 2014 Samoa Honours and Awards were appointments made by the O le Ao o le Malo of Samoa, Tui Atua Tupua Tamasese Efi,  to various Orders, decorations, and medals of Samoa under the Honours and Awards Act 1999. The investiture ceremony was held on 22 December 2014.

The recipients of honours are displayed here as they were styled before their new honour.

Order of Merit of Samoa (OM)

Honorary members (noncitizens)
 Papali’i Chellaraj Satvadas Benjamin
 Taffy Gould
 Tilafaiga Rex Maughan

Members
 Alistair Leighton Hutchinson (Honorary)
 Walter Vermeulen (Honorary)
 Seiuli Paul Wallwork
 Savea Sano Malifa
 Muliagatele Brian Pala Lima OS
 Adimaimalaga Tafuna’i

Order of Samoa

Companions
 Tupua Friedrich Wilhelm Wetzell
 Leali’ie’e Rudolf Henry Ott

Members
 Magi Herman Westerlund

Head of State's Service Order
 Pelenatete Stowers
 Aumua Mata’itusi Simanu
 Te’o Eteuati Uelese Sagala
 Su’a Frieda Margaret Keil–Paul

Head of State's Service Medal
 Margaret Chalichery OS
 Fe’esago Siaosi Fepulea’i
 A’eau Taulupo'o Lafaiali’i
  Lei’ataua Punivalu
  Moti Satuala Tua’iaufa’i Amosa
  Vala Uale Ma’i

References

Orders, decorations, and medals of Samoa
2014 awards